Ami Wazlawik (born 1985/1986) is an American politician and member of the Minnesota House of Representatives. A member of the Minnesota Democratic–Farmer–Labor Party (DFL), she represents District 38B in the northeastern Twin Cities metropolitan area.

Early life, education, and career
Wazlawik graduated from White Bear Lake Area High School. She attended St. Olaf College, studying psychology, and the University of Minnesota, graduating with a Bachelor of Arts in psychology and a master's degree in public policy from the Humphrey School of Public Affairs.

Minnesota House of Representatives
Wazlawik was first elected to the Minnesota House of Representatives in 2018.

Personal life
Wazlawik lives in White Bear Township, Minnesota.

References

External links

 Official House of Representatives website
 Official campaign website

1980s births
Living people
Democratic Party members of the Minnesota House of Representatives
21st-century American politicians
21st-century American women politicians
Women state legislators in Minnesota